The Shapsug Reservoir, also known as the Shapsugskoye Reservoir is a deactivated reservoir in Takhtamukaysky District of the Republic of Adygea, Russia, located  southwest of Krasnodar.

It was built between 1940 and 1952 on the left bank of the Kuban River valley, at the mouth of the Afips River as a part of rice irrigation system and was important to the economy of Krasnodar Krai of Russia. It was named after the Shapsugs—a tribe which has inhabited the area for thousands of years—and is considered a part of historical Shapsugia, which was a part of historical Circassia. In the southeast there is a small bay. The flood water from the reservoir is actively used for crop irrigation. The bottom is subject to severe siltation, and due to pesticides and fertilizers discharged from rice farming, fish kills have occurred in the reservoir, and also in the Krasnodar and Kryukov Reservoirs.

In 2007, reconstruction of the reservoir was started. The cost of the project on reconstruction was estimated at about 1.8 billion rubles, but later rose to 2.4 billion. The reconstruction was scheduled to be completed in 2015, two years later than initially scheduled.

References

Reservoirs in Russia
Reservoirs in Adygea